Sharyngol is a sum (district) of Darkhan-Uul Province in northern Mongolia. The 2010 population census estimated population for Sharyngol is 7,795, being one of the most populous cities in northern Mongolia.

Population 
Sharyngol (Шарынгол) has showed a decrease in population from the 2000 population census, decreasing  from 8,902 [2000] to 7,795 [2010]
Sharyngol is the second most populated city in the Darkhan-Uul Province after the capital Darkhan (city)

Notable Structures 
Sharyngol has a coal mine, for almost half a century. this is probably the most famous thing of Sharyngol, it has tens of stock images and on many news report websites, it probably is the most famous thing from Sharyngol and one known thing from the Darkhan-Uul Province.
The Soviet influence is pretty notable from the buildings, the cars, and heavy Cyrillic usage.

Climate and Geography 
Sharyngol is largely a cold city, with hot summers and very cold winters. situated in the north of Mongolia,  the terrain in Sharyngol is largely surrounded by mountains, in the south of the Darkhan-Uul Province, it is located 218 km (135 miles) from the capital Ulaanbaatar.

References 

Populated places in Mongolia
Districts of Darkhan-Uul Province